Om Hajar Subregion is a subregion in the western Gash-Barka region (Zoba Gash-Barka) of Eritrea. Its capital lies at Om Hajar. The area has a patented history with the Italians and the struggle between the Eritreans and Ethiopians.

Overview
Gash-Setit and Om Hajar District is often referred to as "the breadbasket of Eritrea" because the area is agriculturally rich and more fertile than most of Eritrea. Crops such as sorghum, millet, legumes, cotton and sesame are produced in the area. The high agricultural potential of the area was recognized by the Italians during the occupation and in 1928 they established the Ali Ghider cotton plantation in the area which provided cotton for the Barattolo Textile Factory in Asmara.  Citrus fruits and bananas were also produced in the Gash-Setit but many of the plantations were destroyed during the Eritrean War of Independence in the 1960s or by the Ethiopian army during the 2000 conflict.

Towns and villages
Arcugi
Giamal Biscia

Notes

References
Awate.com: Martyr Statistics

Subregions of Eritrea